The 2015 York Capitals season was the third season for the American Indoor Football (AIF) franchise, and their third season in the AIF.

On July 15, 2014, it was announced that Isaac Carn had purchased the Capitals from Jim Morris. Carn promptly named Eric Dorsey II the team's new coach, though Rick Marsilio was named head coach before the season started. Marsilio was an assistant for the now defunct Harrisburg Stampede, and recruited multiple Stampede players to the Capitals. The recruiting helped, as the Capitals finished the regular season 8–0, clinching the 1 seed in the 2015 AIF Playoffs. The Capitals defeated the ASI Panthers 68–58 to clinch a berth in the 2015 AIF Championship Game against the Chicago Blitz. The Capitals defeated the Blitz 58–30, capturing their first-ever championship.

Regular season

Schedule

Standings

Postseason

Roster

References

York Capitals
York Capitals
Central Penn Capitals